BET Tonight was an American talk show hosted by Tavis Smiley originally from (1998-2001), and subsequently Ed Gordon. It aired on the BET network.

Awards

References

BET original programming
African-American news and public affairs television series
1998 American television series debuts
2002 American television series endings
1990s American television talk shows
2000s American television talk shows
1990s American television news shows
2000s American television news shows
English-language television shows